Seyed Hadi Mirmiran (in Persian سید هادى ميرميران) was an Iranian architect, and manager of Naghsh-e Jahan - Pars Consulting Company. He was born in 1945 in Qazvin, received his M.A. in architecture from the faculty of fine arts of Tehran University in 1968.

Career 
His professional life can be divided into three periods:

- 1968 to 1979 : Chief architect in architectural workshop of National Iranian steel Company, Town planning Department.

- 1980 to 1988 : Chief architect in design department of Khanesazi-e-Iran Company and the chief architect in the design department of Isfahan's General office of housing and urban development.

- 1988 to 2006 : Director and the principal architect of Naghsh-e-Jahan Pars Consulting Engineers.

Notable projects (alone or with Naghsh-e-Jahan Pars):
 Rafsanjan Sport Complex.
 The Embassy of I.R. Iran in Berlin.
 First prize in the competition of National Academies of Islamic Republic of Iran, 1994.
 First prize in the competition for Museum of Center of Presidential Documents, 1994.
 First prize in the competition of  New Building of Ministry of Energy Headquarters, 1996.
 First prize in the competition for the design of Export Development Bank of Iran Headquarters, 1997.
 First prize in the competition held for Integration of Imam Reza's Shrine and Its Surrounding Urban fabric, 1998.
 The selected project in the competition held for the design of History Museum of California- FREZNO, 1999.

Teaching Positions
 Professor of Architecture, Faculty of Architecture, Elm-o-Sanaate Iran
 University, from 1991 to 1997.
 Professor of Architecture, Faculty of Architecture, Islamic Azad
 University of Tehran, 1992 to present.
 Professor of Architecture, Faculty of Architecture, Islamic Azad
 University of Shiraz, 1995 to present.
 Professor of Architecture, Faculty of Architecture, Islamic Azad
 University of Hamedan, 1995 to present.

Sources
 https://web.archive.org/web/20090316083736/http://njp-arch.com/biography.htm

External links
Naqsh-e-Jahan Pars

Iranian architects
1945 births
2006 deaths
People from Qazvin
20th-century Iranian architects
21st-century architects
Recipients of the Order of Culture and Art